The Mountain West – Missouri Valley Challenge was an in-season NCAA Division I men's college basketball series, matching up teams from the Mountain West Conference (MW) and the Missouri Valley Conference (MVC). The series began in November 2009 and featured all of the MW teams against most of the MVC teams. The series was discontinued after the 2018 iteration. 

The first challenge was held in 2009. The conferences agreed to a four-year deal, extending the challenge through 2012. The challenge was not extended beyond its original term and ended after 2012. However, it was announced on April 2, 2015 that the conferences would renew the series in 2015. Since the Mountain West now has 11 members to the MVC's 10, all Missouri Valley members were competing in the renewed series, with one MW team sitting out.

The MW–MVC Challenge occurred from late November through December. The games are hosted by each of the schools. The first two series had nine games played each year, leaving one team from the 10-team MVC without an opponent. In 2011, only eight games were played, leaving two MVC teams without an opponent. With changes to the conference schools, each Challenge since the renewal of the series in 2015 featured 10 games.

The MW leads the series with three wins, one loss, and two ties. New Mexico and Wichita State had the best records at 5–1 each. However, Wichita State will not participate in any future Challenges since the school joined the American Athletic Conference on July 1, 2017.

Team records

Mountain West Conference (3–1–2) 

*School that has since left the MW.

Missouri Valley Conference (1–3–2) 

*School that has since left the MVC.

Results

2009 

Evansville did not participate in the 2009 Challenge.

2010 

 Missouri State did not participate in the 2010 Challenge.

2011 

The Mountain West Conference had two member schools leave the conference (BYU and Utah) and added Boise State prior to the 2011 Challenge, leaving the MW with eight member schools. Accordingly, only eight games were played.
Illinois State and Southern Illinois did not participate in the 2011 Challenge.

2012 

The Mountain West Conference had one member leave the conference (TCU) and added Nevada and Fresno State prior to the 2012 Challenge, returning the conference to nine member schools. Accordingly, nine games were played.
Bradley did not participate in the 2012 Challenge.

2015

2016

2017

2018

References

Mountain West Conference men's basketball
Missouri Valley Conference men's basketball
College men's basketball competitions in the United States
College basketball competitions
Recurring sporting events established in 2009